Adam Czartoryski may refer to:

 Adam Kazimierz Czartoryski (1734–1823), Polish nobleman and man of letters
 Adam Jerzy Czartoryski (1770–1861), Polish nobleman and minister of the Russian Empire
 Adam Ludwik Czartoryski (1872–1937), Polish nobleman, landowner, and patron of the arts
 Adam Karol Czartoryski (born 1940),  Polish-Spanish aristocrat
 Adam Michał Czartoryski (1906–1998), Polish noble